Samut Songkhram ( (Pronunciation)) is the capital of Samut Songkhram Province.

Etymology 
The word "samut" originates from the Sanskrit word "samudra" meaning "ocean", and the word "songkhram" from the Sanskrit "sangrama" meaning "war". Hence the name of the province literally means "war ocean".

Geography
Samut Songkhram is at the mouth of the Mae Klong River to the Gulf of Thailand. By means of canals (khlong) the water of the river is spread through the province for irrigation. At the coast are many evaporation ponds for producing sea salt.

History
In the Ayutthaya period the area of Samut Songkhram was known as Suan Nok (Thai สวนนอก, "outer garden") and was administrated by Ratchaburi. During the reign of King Taksin it became a province. It was the birthplace of Queen Amarindra of King Rama I, who also initiated the name Suan Nok. The birthplace of King Rama II in Amphawa District is now a memorial park.

Notable people
 Apidej Sit-Hirun, a Muay Thai fighter
 Chang and Eng Bunker, the original "Siamese twins"

References

External links

Gallery

Populated places in Samut Songkhram province